Alor Setar Tower, also known as Kedah Tower is a 4-story, 165.5-meter-tall telecommunication tower in Alor Setar, Kedah, Malaysia, It is Malaysia's third tallest tower, the second tallest structure in the state behind MAHA Tower in Kuah, and the tallest structure in the city.

Apart from serving the role of a telecommunication tower, it also caters as a tourist destination for the town. The tower also houses some restaurants and a souvenir shop. The tower is an observatory tower to look for the crescent moon to mark the beginning of Muslim months such as Ramadhan, Shawwal, and Zulhijjah, to celebrate Ramadhan, Hari Raya Aidilfitri and Hari Raya Aidiladha, respectively.

History
Located at the Alor Setar City Centre, it was built in 1994. It is also the second structure in Northern Region of Peninsular Malaysia to surpass  after Penang's KOMTAR Tower. Alor Setar Tower was started in 1994, topped-out in 1995, it surpassed the previous City Plaza Tower, became the third to surpass . The tower was completed in 1996. Opened in 14 August 1997 by Mahathir Mohamad, which was the prime minister at the time.

Following the completion of the Alor Setar Tower, many high-rise and low-rise buildings started taking shape, including Amansuri Residences, Aman Central and SADA Tower.

Gallery

Channels listed by frequency

Television
TV Alhijrah UHF 559.25 MHz (Ch 32)

Radio
Fly FM 99.1 MHz
Buletin FM 107.3 MHz

Menara Alor Setar is a telecommunication tower in Alor Setar, Kedah and a popular tourist destination in the northern region. Bhd, a subsidiary of Telekom Malaysia Berhad (TM), and it was surpassed by Kuantan 188 as the second tallest tower in 2020.

The design of Alor Setar Tower is inspired from the Kedah’s state nickname ‘Jelapang Padi' which refers to the geographical landscape of the state that is dominated by rows of paddy field with the structure of the tower represents 'Serumpun Padi' or the tied rice clusters, while the large pillar supporting the tower structure implies the 'Tiang Seri', symbolizes the strength of the people of Kedah Darul Aman.

There is also Megaview Banquet Hall at  height providing facilities for functions such as meetings, seminars, courses, luncheon, afternoon tea, dinner and more for government agencies, corporate bodies, NGOs, associations, etc.

At  height, there is also Menara Alor Setar's Revolving Restaurant which provides dining in the sky experience hence represents the highest restaurant in Kedah. This restaurant is a suitable place for all occasions such as wedding, dinner, lunch, anniversary celebration and many more.

Recently Menara Alor Setar introduced a unique attraction that will give visitors a new experience called ‘STAR VIEW’, two units of glass box built on the Open Deck at a height of  using the state's official colors; green (facing north) and yellow (facing south).

To complete the new experience for visitors, the Open Deck has been enhanced with a comfortable waiting area and a hydraulic lift to take visitors from Megaview Banquet Hall (TH03) to 'STAR VIEW' (TH04) in addition to the interesting and exclusive floor design and wall finishes.

"The initiative and idea to build the 'STAR VIEW' on the Open Deck of Menara Alor Setar has been inspired by the success of two Sky Box units built on the Sky Deck, Menara Kuala Lumpur". (*photo credit-drone_tech_imaging)

Design
The design of the tower is from Tiang Seri.

References

External links
Menara Alor Star Official Website
Telekom Malaysia Bhd Official Website
Tourism Malaysia - Alor Setar Tower 

Buildings and structures in Kedah
Menara Alor Setar
TM Group of Companies
Towers in Malaysia
Towers with revolving restaurants
Tourist attractions in Kedah
1997 establishments in Malaysia
Alor Setar
Radio masts and towers
Towers completed in 1997